Rinaldo Barlassina (2 May 1898 Novara, Italy – 23 December 1946 Bergamo, Italy) was an Italian international football referee. He was one of the first three Italian referees to officiate in the World Cup (with Francesco Mattea and Albino Carraro).

Career 
He officiated 36 international matches and was FIFA referee in 1931–1942. He attributed 4 matches in 1934 (3) and 1938 (1) World Cup, 1938 World Cup qualifying (2), 1936 Olympic Games (1) and others were in friendly matches. He gave a red card in friendly match in 1935 between Hungary-Austria (6:3) to home team footballer Pál Titkos in 88th minute. He also attributed 4 matches in Central European International Cup in 1931 and 1934-1935 editions and 1937 Eduard Benes Cup Romania-Czechoslovakia (1:1) match which all were friendly matches.

In club football he officiated two Mitropa Cup matches in 1931 and 1936 editions which all of them were final matches.

Below are his important matches were he officiated:

References and notes

External links 

 Profil - eu-football.info
 Profil - www.worldfootball.net
 Profil - worldreferee.com

1898 births
1946 deaths
Italian football referees
FIFA World Cup referees
1934 FIFA World Cup referees
1938 FIFA World Cup referees
Olympic football referees